The Presto card (stylized as PRESTO) is a contactless smart card automated fare collection system used on participating public transit systems in the province of Ontario, Canada, specifically in Greater Toronto, Hamilton, and Ottawa. Presto card readers were implemented on a trial basis from 25 June 2007 to 30 September 2008. Full implementation began in November 2009 and it was rolled out across rapid transit stations, railway stations, bus stops and terminals, and transit vehicles on eleven different transit systems.

A variant of the Presto card is the Presto ticket, introduced on 5 April 2019, which is a single-use paper ticket with an embedded chip. The Presto ticket can only be used for the services of the Toronto Transit Commission.

One of the 10 strategies of The Big Move, the GTHA's regional transportation plan, was to create an integrated transit fare system amongst the 10 public transit agencies in the GTHA. The Presto system was designed to support the use of one common method of fare payment on various participating public transit systems, comparable with other systems such as London's Oyster card and Hong Kong's Octopus card. Presto is an operating division of Metrolinx, the Ontario government agency that manages and integrates road transport and public transportation in the Greater Toronto and Hamilton Area (GTHA).

History
In 2002, the Ministry of Transportation of Ontario (MTO), in conjunction with GO Transit and GTHA municipalities, began investigating the merit of a regional fare card. In October 2006, the Ministry of Transportation signed a 10-year, $250-million contract with Accenture to design, develop and operate the base Presto system for the GTHA. Two major transit agencies, OC Transpo and the Toronto Transit Commission (TTC), agreed to adopt the fare card system in 2007 and 2009 respectively. The larger anticipated userbase prompted the MTO to decide on developing a new system, called Presto Next Generation (PNG). Auditor General of Ontario criticized this move, suggesting that the base Presto system should have been expanded to accommodate OC Transpo and the Toronto Transit Commission.

Thales Group and Accenture were awarded the contract to supply this system in October 2009. Implementation is the responsibility of Metrolinx, of which Presto became an operating division in 2011.

The Presto project was strongly criticized by the Auditor General of Ontario in 2012 for "roll-out glitches, cost escalations and untendered contract extensions" and warned the system could become the world's most expensive fare-card implementation project. Instead of putting the development Presto Next Generation out to competitive tender, Metrolinx simply increased the size of the original base contract awarded to Accenture in 2006. By 2012, the cost of the system ballooned to $700million.

The Presto rollout on the TTC's surface transit fleet have been marred with abnormally high failure rates of the readers themselves and cost overruns. A TTC position paper noted that faulty Presto card readers used by fare inspectors on the proof-of-payment streetcar system is making it "difficult to get customers to comply with inspections" and costing the TTC in lost fare revenue.

A 3 June 2017 story in the Toronto Star first reported that customers' Presto travel histories were provided to police authorities 12 times in the previous year, with a warrant having been required for only two of those disclosures and customers typically not having been notified that their records had been shared. The figures were confirmed by Metrolinx in later reports, stating that they had granted 12 of 26 requests received from various police agencies. In response to calls for reforming the data sharing system from experts and transit riding advocates, Metrolinx launched a formal review of its privacy policies.

The rollout of the fare system and accompanying replacement fare gates on the TTC's subway network was met with poor reliability and issues with processing transactions. Presto was forced to use its existing software back-end for other municipal transit partners that have completed the roll-out, as the TTC has yet to develop its own dedicated infrastructure to process the larger volume of transactions it typically handles. The new fare gates suffered from persistent mechanical and software problems, prompting the TTC to suspend the rollout for a month to work with the contractor, Scheidt & Bachmann, to resolve reliability issues. As a result, over 2,000 motors on more than 1,000 gates had to be replaced in addition to numerous hardware and software updates. The June 2018 deadline for the complete roll-out of Presto for the TTC will be further pushed to 2019 due to these ongoing issues, prompting a delay in the phasing out of cash fares, tokens and other legacy fare media. As a result, the TTC will face higher fare collection costs as it incurs "transitional costs" of operating parts of Presto and the legacy fare regimes concurrently over the next few years. A situation TTC board member John Campbell describes as "totally inefficient".

In its annual report released in 2018, Metrolinx indicated it expected the cost of the Presto system to reach $1.2billion, with $1billion already spent in the development and implementation the system between 2002 and March 2018. While Presto was designed for complex fare transactions between GTA transit agencies, up until the fourth quarter of 2019, the system on TTC buses was not able to support the payment of special surcharges for TTC express downtown buses and TTC trips that enter Mississauga and York Region where a Miway or YRT fare was required. , the TTC Presto system at large continues to experience abnormally high failure rates. This led to an estimated loss of at least $3.4 million in revenue in 2018 alone according to the TTC. The 2018 Audit Work Plan by the auditor general of Ontario noted that the number of reports of Presto collection machines not functioning properly is likely under-counted and a breakdown in communication between Metrolinx, the TTC, and two of its vendors led to operational issues. This included a finding that over half the "out-of-service" incidents raised for the fare vending machines on the TTC's new Flexity streetcars are "coin or token box full" errors, the root cause being miscommunication between the TTC and Metrolinx on coin and token collection leading to the vending machines not being emptied frequently enough.

In early 2018, Metrolinx detailed a plan to increase transit ridership by use of a mobile app (available for Android and iOS devices) which it released to the public for testing in beta version in late 2018. The app will eventually allow transit users to pay directly from their mobile device.

Card use

Presto cards are available to purchase at most Shoppers Drug Mart stores, transit centres in the GTHA and Ottawa, over the phone and online. Beginning in Stage 3, cardholders will also be able to load passes for up to three transit systems at a time on to their Presto card. When boarding, riders tap the prepaid card, embedded with an RFID chip, on to a reader. The reader will then check for either a valid transit pass, or automatically deduct the lowest available fare from the card's balance stored in its e-purse ("stored balance"). GO Transit and Union Pearson Express (UP Express or UPX) riderswhose fares are calculated by distanceand those riding TTC buses which travel into the City of Mississauga or York Regionwhich require an extra fare to be paid when crossing the fare zone boundariesmust also tap their cards at the end of a trip.

Presto readers show a large white check mark on a green background (if accepted) or a large white "X" on a red background (if declined), accompanied by one of several messages. For monthly, weekly and single-day transit passes, the expiry date is shown. For a stored-balance fare at initial tap-on, the reader shows the fare deducted, balance remaining, and transfer period allowed. For subsequent taps within the transfer window, the transfer time remaining is shown. GO Transit and Union Pearson Express readers, at both tap-on and tap-off, also shows much of the same information as those of a local system for a stored-balance fare at initial tap-on.

Loyalty programs are also available on some transit systems, where frequent use of the system results in greater discounts on fare payment.

The Presto card works on several transit systems and has other features:
 Autoload: The autoload feature allows cardholders to have a predetermined value automatically loaded onto their Presto card, when the stored balance value reaches a specified threshold. It will charge the cardholder's credit or debit card.
 Autorenew, for monthly passes: Six days before the end of each month, the next month's pass is automatically loaded onto the card. The new pass becomes effective the first day of the new month. Payment is charged as for an autoload.
 Lost card replacement: If a registered cardholder loses their Presto card, they can have their lost card blocked immediately upon reporting the loss, and the remaining balance transferred to a replacement card.
 Underpayment allowance: If a registered card has insufficient funds to pay a fare, but the balance is greater than $0 and has sufficient funds to cover the minimum base fare, the cardholder can incur a negative balance for one trip for a fee of $0.25.
 Transit usage reports: Through an online account, a user can track transit usage, customize the data, and download it to a spreadsheet in CSV format.

A Braille letter "P" was placed on the Presto card to help distinguish it from other cards in a wallet, after consultation with feedback from visually impaired customers.

Presto cards purchased from the Presto website or from automated self-service vending machines in TTC, GO Transit and UP Express stations are set to the adult fare rates. For concessionary fares (such as child, senior, youth or post-secondary student), one must present the Presto card at either a transit centre or at some Shoppers Drug Mart locations with appropriate identification to have the concession fare rate set.

Participation

The following transit service providers use Presto:
 Brampton Transit
 Burlington Transit
 Durham Region Transit
 GO Transit
 Hamilton Street Railway
 MiWay (Mississauga)
 Oakville Transit
 OC Transpo (Ottawa)
 Toronto Transit Commission
 Union Pearson Express
 York Region Transit

Rollout
In July 2007, 500 commuters who normally commuted from Meadowvale and Cooksville GO stations in Mississauga to Union Station in downtown Toronto received a free card and tried the system under a trial termed "Launch 1". Officials decided to test the fare system on Mississauga's neighbourhood shuttle service in Meadowvale and Cooksville that transports passengers to GO Transit. During the Launch 1 trial, the Presto card could be used at:
 Miway (shuttle routes of 60 Meadowvale Shuttle-Crosscurrent, 62 Cooksville Shuttle-Webb, 63 Cooksville Shuttle-Kaneff, 64 Meadowvale Shuttle-Montevideo only)
 GO Transit (Meadowvale and Cooksville GO stations only)
 Toronto Transit Commission ( subway station only)
The Launch 1 trial concluded 30 September 2008.

The Presto card has been introduced in stages beginning in the fourth quarter of 2009.

Stage 1
The first stage of the production rollout schedule was launched on 30 November 2009 and included a limited number of recruited customers to test the system. Stage One included Oakville, Bronte and Union GO Stations, TTC Union Subway Station, and ten Oakville Transit buses on three routes.

Stage 2
The second stage of the production rollout schedule was launched on 10 May 2010. In this stage, the Presto system became available to the general public and transit users were able to purchase Presto cards and use them at participating stations and transit systems. Stage Two was launched similarly to Stage One, but with full participation from Oakville Transit and Burlington Transit. GO Transit continued its system-wide rollout, with the Lakeshore East, Milton and Georgetown lines coming online at a rate of a few stations a week. The Toronto Transit Commission added six downtown stations (St. George, Queen's Park, St. Patrick, Dundas, College, Bloor/Yonge) to the Presto system. Two more stations (Kipling and Islington) were added in mid-2010. The third stage of the production rollout schedule was scheduled for the fourth quarter of 2010 to bring more transit systems and stations into the Presto system.

Stage 3
The third stage of the rollout schedule expanded the rollout to a larger scale, covering the entire 905 region and Hamilton. GO Transit completed its rollout for trains and buses in mid-2012. Since then, all new GO Train stations and buses have had Presto readers on the first day of service.

In the end of this stage, all but two local transit systems had completed their rollout. Hamilton Street Railway was the first to roll out in this stage on 3 May 2011. Brampton Transit became fully Presto-enabled on 30 May 2011. On the same date, MiWay made the farecard available to adult passengers only. Durham Region Transit launched Presto card for co-fares with GO Transit on 27 June 2011. Almost a month later, York Region Transit launched the Presto card in all of its Vivastations and buses. The TTC added Presto card as fare payment option in Don Mills, Downsview, Finch, Yorkdale and York Mills subway stations. In this stage, concession fares were added for GO Transit, Oakville Transit, Burlington Transit, Brampton Transit, York Region Transit and MiWay; and co-fares for GO buses have been offered by MiWay and Brampton Transit exclusively for Presto cardholders. Also in this stage, only Durham Region Transit remains to roll out its regular fares.

Presto's self-service kiosks debuted at Union Station for a pilot project during this period. Reception of the pilot kiosks was found to be favourable. The pilot kiosks have since been removed and a widespread rollout of automated reload systems is ongoing throughout GO, TTC, and Union Pearson Express stations.

Stage 4 and Presto Next Generation
The fourth stage of the rollout added Ottawa's OC Transpo, commencing as a soft launch in the second quarter of 2012 and as a full rollout on 18 May 2013. It is the only agency to receive the Presto card so far outside the Greater Toronto and Hamilton area. This stage involved the initial rollout of Presto Next Generation (PNG). OC Transpo's Presto readers are compatible with the Société de transport de l'Outaouais's new Multi farecards and Presto cards are compatible with pass readers on STO buses, thus facilitating transfers between the two.

Stage Four also marked the extensive rollout of the Presto fare system on the TTC, also using the Presto Next Generation system, while the participating transit systems that had already fully rolled out in the earlier stages were to receive Presto Next Generation cards late in the fourth quarter of 2012. Payment by other means, such as open payment and mobile payment systems, will also be made compatible with this updated version of Presto card.

Stage Four and Presto Next Generation had been criticized for numerous delays with launching OC Transpo service. Metrolinx set 1 July 2012 as the Presto launch date for Ottawa, but in June 2012, it was postponed to 1 February 2013. City staff decided to launch Presto in several stages for 2013, the last of which occurred on 18 May 2013.

The first major addition of Presto on the TTC took place in the fourth quarter of 2014, with the introduction of Presto card machines in several more Toronto subway stations, and the launch of new streetcars equipped with this system (see below).

TTC participation

Expansion
 Toronto Transit Commission: Expansions in the TTC will be Presto-equipped from their opening day, which includes Line 5 Eglinton.
 GO Transit: All future GO stations will be Presto-equipped as early as the station opening.
 Other transit systems: Requirements are being developed in order to incorporate additional transit agencies into Presto card. Many transit systems in the Greater Golden Horseshoe have expressed interest in adopting the Presto card as a fare payment system:
Milton Transit, the only transit system in the Greater Toronto Area that has not participated during the first phase, is working with Metrolinx to adopt the farecard.
 Guelph Transit is exploring its options in adopting the Presto card as a fare payment system.
 Grand River Transit expressed interest in participating with the rollout of the Presto card but now has decided to go to another system.
 Negotiations with Barrie Transit are ongoing with regards to the adoption of Presto card.
 Niagara Falls Transit's new fareboxes are designed to be capable of handling Presto cards, and are now participating for those transferring from a GO Bus or Train.
 Discussions in St. Catharines Transit are underway for participation in Presto.
 Niagara Region Transit's operators are also interested in adopting the farecard.

Fares
Participating transit systems have different fares and fare policies when using the Presto card compared to traditional fare media; generally, passengers receive a discount using Presto compared to cash fares. The implementation of the Presto card has also unified the fare categories of GO Transit and local transit agencies, with local transit agencies adopting the GO Transit standard: local transit agencies used to have different age limits for child and senior fares and different types of students that may use student fares (some excluding post-secondary students while others do not). Registered Presto card holders are assessed the senior or child fares as appropriate. Student fare classification must be activated by the card-issuing transit authority through its normal procedures, which differ between transit systems. For example, post-secondary student fares are classified as students in only GO Transit and MiWay, while the rest classify them under the adult category.

Other Presto card fare notes:
Durham Region Transit: DRT/GO Bus integration is not supported with the Presto card. Passengers taking a GO Transit route where DRT fare media is accepted will be charged GO Transit fares.
GO Transit: Fares for adult and student passengers between two fare zones are reduced to levels comparable to that of 10-ride tickets formerly offered by GO Transit. The loyalty discount system is in place where passengers frequently travelling between two fare zones will receive further discounts after 30 (student) or 35 trips (adult) in a single month, so the fare paid per month never exceeds that of the corresponding GO Transit monthly pass. Fares for senior passengers do not receive a further discount beyond the same 50% of adult (ticket) prices offered via traditional fare media. See GO Transit fares for more information.
 Passengers connecting to local transit from GO Transit will only be assessed the co-fare, if applicable, on the Presto card if the GO Transit trip was also assessed to the Presto card; the full local fare will be assessed otherwise. Passengers connecting to GO transit from local transit will have their co-fare discounts assessed when disembarking from their GO Transit trips.
Hamilton Street Railway: GO Transit co-fares are done differently for Presto card holders compared to holders of traditional fare media. Passengers transferring to HSR from GO Transit will receive a $1.60 discount on the HSR fare, while passengers transferring to GO Transit from HSR will also receive a $1.60 discount on the GO Transit fare.
OC Transpo (Ottawa): Presto cards registered to addresses in Quebec may not use the Presto card when boarding OC Transpo buses, as per existing residency policies between OC Transpo and STO; STO fare media (including the STO Passe-Partout PLUS Card) must be used instead.
 The "free fares for Seniors category on Wednesdays" is not enforced by Presto systems; a full fare will be assessed. Seniors riding OC Transpo buses on Wednesdays are encouraged to avoid tapping their Presto cards therein, unless intending to transfer to STO buses.

Toronto Transit Commission: As of January 2018, the TTC has implemented the Presto card machines at all 75 subway stations, and on-board all TTC conventional buses and streetcars. There are no free transfer privileges for Presto card holders when transferring to or from other neighbouring Presto-enabled Greater Toronto Area transit services (such as Miway, Brampton Transit, York Regional Transit GO Transit, Union Pearson Express and Durham Regional Transit), meaning a full fare is charged when transferring between these agencies. Since 26 August 2018, there is also a 2-hour time-based transfer window available to Presto card or ticket holders who pay single fares using their stored card or ticket balance; with this transfer, customers are entitled to unlimited travel for two hours across the TTC network, from their first tap of the Presto card or ticket, and have the ability to enter and exit any TTC vehicle (bus or streetcar) or subway station and/or switch directions without having to pay another fare. Unlike the other Greater Toronto transit agencies, the time-based transfer is currently not available for those who carry TTC paper transfers; these are good for a continuous one-way trip with no stopovers or backtracking permitted.

York Region Transit: YRT Express fare supplements are automatically deducted.
 YRT fares are assessed when boarding Züm buses in York Region due to fare integration with Viva Orange, even though both YRT and Brampton Transit fare media are accepted for Züm buses in York Region. Passengers holding a Brampton Transit period pass will not be assessed a fare when boarding a Züm bus in York Region, but will be assessed a fare for boarding Viva Orange. As Viva Orange is on a proof-of-payment system while Züm buses are pay-as-you-board, it does not matter whether fares are deducted at the Vivastation vending machine or on board a Züm bus, except in the case of Brampton Transit period pass holders.
 Effective 26 August 2019, the Presto card can be used to pay a YRT fare on TTC bus routes that travel in York Region (north of Steeles Avenue), but limited-use TTC Presto tickets are not accepted.

Inter-agency transfers
Local transit systems (except for the TTC and OC Transpo) within the Presto card's service area have always honoured transfers from neighbouring transit systems, and transferring between neighbouring transit systems continues to be honoured with the Presto Card where they were honoured with traditional fare media.

On most transit agencies, paper transfers are not required for Presto card users since the card itself acts as proof-of-payment (POP) which can also be used to transfer from vehicle to vehicle or vehicle to station (and vice versa) and/or to show enforcement officers on designated POP routes on which they carry hand-held devices to verify that payment was made (tapped on upon entry to the station or vehicle) except in the following cases:
 "Companion fares" - using stored value in the Presto card e-purse to pay fares for two or more passengers; paper transfers will be issued for all passengers other than the cardholder.
 Depending on the transit operators involved, transferring from a local transit agency where the passenger has a local period pass to a neighbouring transit agency where the passenger does not (such as from Hamilton Street Railway to Burlington Transit while the Presto Card has a period pass for HSR); a full fare for the second transit agency will otherwise be assessed to the Presto Card.

As the Presto card is meant to replace paper transfers along with cash, tickets, tokens and paper passes, local transit operators have generally adopted the Presto card's transfer policies in their paper transfers (in the sense that, with the exception of the TTC and OC Transpo, all local transit operators accept each other's transfers, and will not reissue transfers originally issued by other local transit operators), except for a generally longer transfer window provided by the Presto card.

Use with non-Presto agencies
Barrie Transit: GO Transit users allowed to transfer to Barrie Transit buses for free by presenting their Presto cards at applicable connection points.
Guelph Transit: Free transfers to and from GO Transit are offered for Presto card users or other GO media to and from Guelph Central GO Station.
Grand River Transit: Free transfers to and from GO Transit are offered for Presto card users to and from Kitchener GO Station.
Milton Transit: GO Transit users allowed to transfer to Milton Transit buses for free by presenting their Presto cards or other GO media at applicable connection points.
Société de transport de l'Outaouais (STO): Presto card is compatible with STO Multi Card readers on STO buses. Passengers may use the Presto card to transfer to STO from OC Transpo; passengers with an OC Transpo monthly pass loaded on the Presto card may also board STO buses without having previously transferred from OC Transpo.
 STO Multi Card readers are unable to deduct cash fares from Presto card holders. As such, the Presto cards may not be used to board an STO bus directly, nor provide companion fares.

Presto ticket

A Presto ticket is a single-use, paper ticket with an embedded electronic chip. Like the Presto card, users must tap the Presto ticket on a Presto reader when entering a TTC bus, streetcar or subway station. Unlike the Presto card, the Presto ticket is valid only for TTC services; it cannot be used for any other regional service providers or on TTC bus routes operating outside of the City of Toronto, such as those in York Region (north of Steeles Avenue) and Mississauga (west of Pearson Airport). The Presto ticket is intended for infrequent TTC customers.

There are 3 types of Presto ticket: 1-ride, 2-ride and day pass. Customers can purchase up to 10 Presto tickets at a time from Presto fare vending machines at all TTC subway stations. Unlike Presto cards, Presto tickets do not support concession fares for seniors, students, youth or children. As with Presto cards, there is a 2-hour transfer period for 1- and 2-ride Presto tickets for TTC services. The Presto day pass expires at 2:59a.m. on the day following the ticket's first use.

A Presto ticket is not reloadable and is meant to be discarded once the travel period has ended. Because of the embedded chip, the ticket is not recyclable. Presto tickets bought by individuals must be used within 90 days of purchase, although service agencies may purchase Presto tickets that can be used up to one year from purchase. All Presto tickets have an expiry date so as not to overload the central computer system that tracks all unexpired Presto tickets. Presto fare vending machines at subway stations have an inquiry feature to check whether a purchased Presto ticket is still valid.

, Presto tickets are available for purchase at all TTC subway stations.

Open contactless payment
On some GTHA transit systems, customers also have the option to tap a contactless credit card (such as Visa, Mastercard or American Express) or a mobile device (mobile phone or watch) on a Presto fare reader and pay their transit fares when boarding a transit vehicle (and alighting for GO Transit or UP Express) in addition to being able to use the Presto card. UP Express was the first transit service provider with this system on board when it first launched on March 11, 2021. 

 open contactless payment options can be used on the following transit service providers:
 Brampton Transit
 Burlington Transit
 Durham Regional Transit
 GO Transit
 Hamilton Street Railway
 Oakville Transit
 MiWay
 UP Express
 York Regional Transit

See also

 List of smart cards

Notes

References

External links
 
 Official website

Contactless smart cards
Fare collection systems in Canada
Metrolinx
2007 establishments in Ontario